Westmoreland is an unincorporated community in Westmoreland County, in the U. S. state of Virginia.

Spence's Point was listed on the National Register of Historic Places in 1971.

Notable People 
Augustine Washington Sr. (1694-1743) - Father of U.S. President George Washington

Lawrence Washington (1659–1698) - Grandfather of U.S. President George Washington, soldier

References

GNIS entry

Unincorporated communities in Virginia
Unincorporated communities in Westmoreland County, Virginia